Chesnokovka is a rural locality (a selo) and the administrative centre of Chesnokovsky Selsoviet, Ufimsky District, Bashkortostan, Russia. The population was 3,333 as of 2010. There are 83 streets.

Geography 
Chesnokovka is located 15 km south of Ufa (the district's administrative centre) by road. Zubovo is the nearest rural locality.

References 

Rural localities in Ufimsky District